Japanese Paralympic Committee (JPC) is a National Paralympic Committee (NPC) of Japan. The committee was established on August 20, 1999, and is recognized by International Paralympic Committee (IPC), Asian Paralympic Committee (APC) and Ministry of Health.

See also
Japan at the Paralympics
Japanese Olympic Committee

References

External links
Official website

National Paralympic Committees
1999 establishments in Japan
Sports organizations established in 1999
Paralympic
Disability organizations based in Japan